Merani may refer to:
Alipur Merani, a subdivision of Alipur Tehsil in Pakistan
Ricardo Merani, Indonesian footballer
Merani language, a Papuan language of New Guinea
Merani, Iran, a village in Vilkij-e Markazi Rural District, Vilkij District, Namin County, Ardabil Province, Iran
FC Merani Martvili, a Georgian association football club based in Martvili
FC Merani Tbilisi, a Georgian football club based in Tbilisi

See also 
 Merini